St. Andrew's All Boys School is a Lasallian school in Muar, Johor, Malaysia.

References

Muar District
Secondary schools in Malaysia